Nundy is a surname. Notable people with the surname include:

 Jeff Nundy (born 1935), English football player
 Karuna Nundy (born 1976), Indian lawyer
 Samiran Nundy, Indian surgeon, medical academic, and writer

See also
 Nandy (surname)